Joey Palfreyman (born 21 February 1974) is an English darts player who competes in Professional Darts Corporation events.

Career
Palfreyman made his first impact in a PDC event at the 2013 UK Open by beating Keegan Brown and Steve Beaton to face Raymond van Barneveld in the last 32. He lost 9–3 but earned £2,000 for his efforts, the highest of his career to date. Later in the month he reached the last 16 of an event for the first time by beating Robert Thornton 6–5 in the fifth Players Championship, before being whitewashed 6–0 by Terry Temple.

In 2014, Palfreyman qualified for the German Darts Championship and was defeated 6–3 by Adrian Lewis in the second round. He failed to qualify for the UK Open as he could not win past the last 128 in any of the six qualifiers. In his remaining 15 events Palfreyman could not advance beyond the last 64.
He lost in the last 32 of two Challenge Tour events in 2015 and played in the 13th Players Championship of 2016, where he beat Berry van Peer 6–4, before being defeated 6–2 by Ian White in the second round.

References

External links

Living people
Professional Darts Corporation former tour card holders
English darts players
1974 births